Vinod Kumar Alva (born 1 April 1963) is an Indian actor who has worked predominantly in Telugu cinema and appeared in Kannada,Tamil & Malayalam films.

Filmography

Telugu 

Mayadari Mogudu (1984)
Mouna Poratam (1989)
Adavilo Abhimanyudu (1989) as Suresh
Navayugam (1990) as Suryam
Judgement (1990)
Karthavyam (1990) as Suribabu
Karthavyam (1990)
Mamagaru (1991) as Vijay Kumar
Bharat Bandh (1991)
Manchi Roju (1991)
Atta Sommu Alludu Danam (1992)
Samarpana (1992)
Gangwar (1992)
Seetharatnam Gari Abbayi (1992)
Bangaru Mama (1992)
Champion (1992)
Attaku Koduku Mamaku Alludu (1993)
Rajadhani (1993)
Shabhash Ramu (1993)
Mogudu Garu (1993)
Andaroo! Andare!! (1994)
Qaidi No. 1 (1994)
Shrivaari Priyuralu (1994)
O Tandri O Koduku (1994)
Police Brothers (1994)
Police Lockup (1994)
Mayadari Kutumbam (1995)
Lady Boss (1995)
Amma Naa Kodala (1995)
Tata Manavadu (1996) as Gopi Krishna
Bobbili Bullodu (1996)
Prema Prayanam (1996)
Amma Ammani Choodalani Undi (1996)
Veerudu (1996)
Vammo Vatto O Pellaamo (1997)
Panjaram (1997)
Maa Balaji (1999) as Sikandar
Neelambari (2001)
Prema Sandadi (2001) as Teja
Anna Sainyam (2002)
Bharat Ratna (2002)
Prema Donga (2002)
Shanti Sandesham (2003)
Asadhyudu (2006)
Samanyudu (2006) as Lingam Goud
Gopi – Goda Meeda Pilli (2006)
Maharajashri (2007)
Toss (2007)
Donga Sachinollu (2008)
Deepavali (2008)
Kalidasu (2008)
Aa Intlo (2009)
Punnami Naagu (2009)
18, 20 Love Story (2009)
Samarthudu (2009)
Bhageerathudu (2010) as Y. S. Rajasekhara Reddy
Shakti (2011) as Prachanda
Babloo (2011)
Cricket, Girls and Beer (2011)
Tuneega Tuneega (2012) as Ravindra Babu's brother-in-law
Srimannarayana (2012) as Gyaneshwar
Mahankali (2013)
Potugadu (2013)
Chandee (2013)
Adavi Kaachina Vennela (2014)
Rudhramadevi (2015) as Ganna Reddy's paternal uncle
Red Alert (2015)
Sati Timmamamba (2016)
Pidugu (2016)
Yuddham Sharanam (2017)
Yatra (2019)
Katha Kanchiki Manam Intiki (2022)
Dharmasthali (2022)

Kannada 

Thavaru Mane (1985)
Namma Ooru Devathe (1986)
Thaliya Aane (1987)
Thali Gagi (1987)
Bhoomi Thayane (1988)
Dharma Pathni (1988)
Sahasa Veera (1988)
Thayi Karulu (1988)
Thayiya Aase (1988)
Krishna Mechida Radhe (1988)
Madhuri (1989)
Bala Hombale (1989)
Hosa Kavya (1989)
Maha Yuddha (1989)
Singari Bangari (1989)
Thaligagi (1989)
Kadina Veera (1990)
Amar Akbar Anthony (1998)
Mafia (2001)
Neelambari (2001)
Kullara Loka (2002)
Police Dog (2002)
Punjabi House (2002)
Thrishakthi (2002)
Thalwar (2003)
Border (2003)
Shri Kalikamba (2003)
Pandava (2004)
Yaake (2005)
Gadipar (2005)
Onti Mane (2010)
Power (2014)
Bairagee(2022)

Tamil 
 Hero (1994)
Game (2002)
Ji (2005)

Malayalam 
Aalilakkuruvikal (1988) as Shashi
Sathya (2017)

Television 

 9 Hours (2022) as Viswanath; Disney+ Hotstar
dsl;ss

Awards
1991 - Nandi Award for Best Supporting Actor - Mamagaru

References

External links

Male actors in Telugu cinema
Indian male film actors
Male actors in Kannada cinema
Male actors in Tamil cinema
Male actors in Malayalam cinema
1963 births
Living people
Nandi Award winners
Male actors from Mangalore
20th-century Indian male actors
21st-century Indian male actors